Thomas James William Taiwo (born 27 February 1990) is an English former footballer who played as a midfielder.

An England under-17 international, he graduated out of the Chelsea academy to turn professional in 2008, having switched from the Leeds United Academy two years earlier. He never appeared for the first team, and instead enjoyed a brief loan spell at Port Vale, before he joined Carlisle United on a loan deal that was made permanent in January 2010. He played in two consecutive League Trophy finals for the club, as Carlisle were defeated in 2010, before they won the tournament in 2011.

He joined Scottish club Hibernian in September 2012, and stayed with the club for two seasons. He signed with Falkirk in July 2014, and played on the losing side in the 2015 Scottish Cup Final. He joined Hamilton Academical in June 2018, and retired due to injury in June 2019.

Club career

Chelsea
Tom was a student at St Mary's Menston Catholic Voluntary Academy. He joined Chelsea from Leeds United along with Michael Woods in a controversial move after Ken Bates accused Chelsea of tapping up the youngsters. Leeds received £5 million in compensation for the pair after threatening to take Chelsea to court. He broke his leg two days before he was due to make his youth team debut for the "Blues". His parents were accused of taking backhanders to influence his decision; Taiwo stated that these "false claims" were highly "upsetting" to him.

Taiwo joined League Two club Port Vale on a month's loan in August 2008. He made his debut, coming on as a substitute in the 61st minute, at home to Bournemouth, in the 3–1 win on 30 August. Vale sent him back to Chelsea in September after they decided not to extend his loan. Taiwo went on a trial with the Seattle Sounders of Major League Soccer in March 2009.

Carlisle United
In July 2009, Carlisle United announced they had signed Taiwo on loan until the end of December. He impressed supporters with his "aggressive, tackle-heavy performances at the heart of the midfield." Taiwo scored his first goal for Carlisle in a 3–2 league victory over rivals Hartlepool United on 1 December. On 6 January 2010, Carlisle signed Taiwo from Chelsea permanently on a two-and-a-half-year contract, after paying the London club an undisclosed fee. He played a total of 35 League One games in 2009–10. He also featured in six of Carlisle's seven games in the 2009–10 League Trophy, including the final in front of 73,476 fans at Wembley, which ended in a 4–1 defeat to Southampton; he was a late substitute for captain Paul Thirlwell, with the "Blues" already 4–0 down.

He played five games of Carlisle's march to the League Trophy final in 2010–11; he also started the final against Brentford, which the "Cumbrians" won 1–0. In total he made 55 appearances in league and cup for Greg Abbott's side, scoring three goals. He scored three times in 41 games in 2011–12, as Carlisle finished eighth, missing out on the play-offs by a four-point margin. On 11 June 2012, Taiwo revealed he would not be signing a new contract with Carlisle, citing family reasons for his departure from Brunton Park. However Carlisle retained his registration and initially demanded a £200,000 transfer fee from other clubs – a prospect that ended a potential move to Yorkshire club Bradford City.

Hibernian
In September 2012, Taiwo signed a two-year contract with Scottish Premier League club Hibernian. "Hibs" manager Pat Fenlon said that he felt Taiwo was a quality signing, and would provide competition for central midfielders Jorge Claros and Gary Deegan. Speaking about his move, Taiwo stated his belief that the club could challenge for the league title. Carlisle manager Greg Abbott criticised Taiwo's move to Scotland, claiming it was a poor decision and that he had been badly advised. Taiwo made his "Hibs" debut on 6 October, in a 3–0 win over Dundee at Easter Road.

Early in the January 2014 window, BBC Sport reported that new manager Terry Butcher had made Taiwo available for transfer. Butcher refused to confirm the report, but said that allowing some players to leave would freshen the squad and that he was also looking to recruit some new players. Taiwo was released by Hibernian at the end of the 2013–14 season.

Falkirk
Taiwo joined Scottish Championship side Falkirk in July 2014 after manager Peter Houston sought to add experience to his midfield. He scored three goals in 41 appearances for the "Bairns" in the 2014–15 season, including one at Ibrox Stadium that effectively ended Rangers's chances of beating his former club Hibernian into second place. Falkirk also reached the 2015 Scottish Cup Final, where they lost 2–1 to Inverness Caledonian Thistle at Hampden Park.

He played 27 games in the 2015–16 season as Falkirk posted a second-place finish, before they lost 4–1 on aggregate to Kilmarnock in the play-off final. On 12 November 2016, he was sent off in a 1–1 draw at former club Hibernian after a reckless challenge on John McGinn. He made 38 appearances across the 2016–17 campaign, helping Falkirk to qualify for the play-offs with a second-place finish; he played both legs of the 4–3 aggregate defeat to Dundee United in the play-off semi-final. Taiwo left Falkirk Stadium after he was released by Falkirk manager Paul Hartley upon the conclusion of the 2017–18 season.

Hamilton Academical
On 24 June 2018, Taiwo signed with Scottish Premiership club Hamilton Academical. However he was judged to have been a poor signing by manager Martin Canning and he left Hamilton by mutual consent in May 2019 after making 19 appearances during the 2018–19 season. He retired due to injury in June 2019, at the age of 29.

International career
Although he has played for England at youth level, he is eligible to represent Nigeria through his paternal grandfather. He was named as a substitute in all of England's games at the 2007 UEFA European Under-17 Football Championship, however he did not feature in the defeat to Spain in the final. He did though make it off the bench in the 1–1 draw with Belgium and the 1–0 semi-final victory over France.

Style of play
Taiwo "has a reputation as a tough-tackling and wholehearted player".

Career statistics

Honours
Carlisle United
Football League Trophy: 2010–11runner-up: 2009–10

Falkirk
Scottish Cup runner-up: 2014–15

References

External links

1990 births
Living people
Sportspeople from Pudsey
People educated at St. Mary's Catholic High School, Menston
English footballers
England youth international footballers
Black British sportspeople
English people of Nigerian descent
Association football midfielders
Farsley Celtic F.C. players
Leeds United F.C. players
Chelsea F.C. players
Port Vale F.C. players
Carlisle United F.C. players
Hibernian F.C. players
Falkirk F.C. players
Hamilton Academical F.C. players
English Football League players
Scottish Premier League players
Scottish Professional Football League players